Kendall J. Van Dyk (born March 21, 1980) is a Democratic Party member of the Montana Senate, representing District 25 in north-central Billings, Montana since 2011.

Personal life and education
Van Dyk earned a B.A. in political science from Montana State University. Van Dyk has volunteered for Habitat for Humanity and the Montana Wildlife Federation. He is a member of the Montana Bowhunters Association, the Montana Conservation Voters, the Rocky Mountain Elk Foundation, and the National Rifle Association.

Career
Van Dyk has worked as the Western Energy Coordinator for Trout Unlimited, a field organizer for the Northern Plains Resource Council, and as a ranch hand at Spring Creek Farms. Van Dyk served in the House from 2007 until 2011.

Van Dyk served as chairman of the Fish, Wildlife and Parks Committee in the Montana House of Representatives. He is the author of the most recent update to the Montana Stream Access Law, an Act of the 2009 session giving the public the right to access Montana rivers and streams from public bridges. In a run for the 25th Senate district of Montana in 2010, Van Dyk unseated incumbent Republican Senator Roy Brown by just four votes.

References

1980 births
Living people
Democratic Party members of the Montana House of Representatives
Democratic Party Montana state senators
Montana State University alumni
Politicians from Bozeman, Montana